Yobo is a surname. Notable people with the surname include:

Joseph Yobo (born 1980), Nigerian footballer, brother of Albert
Adaeze Yobo (born 1990), Nigerian socialite
Albert Yobo (born 1979), Nigerian footballer

See also
Yoko (name)